Chad Anderson (born April 19, 1979) is an American politician and former member of the Minnesota House of Representatives. A member of the Republican Party of Minnesota, he represented District 50B in the south-central Twin Cities metropolitan area.

Early life, education, and career
Anderson attended Bethel University, graduating with a B.A. He is a real estate broker.

Minnesota House of Representatives
Anderson was elected to the Minnesota House of Representatives in a special election on February 9, 2016 and assumed office on February 17, 2016. He lost re-election to Minnesota Democratic–Farmer–Labor Party (DFL) candidate Andrew Carlson.

Personal life
Anderson and his wife, Anne, have four children. They reside in Bloomington, Minnesota.

His father-in-law is state Senator Dan Hall.

References

External links

1979 births
Living people
People from Bloomington, Minnesota
Bethel University (Minnesota) alumni
Businesspeople from Minnesota
Republican Party members of the Minnesota House of Representatives
21st-century American politicians